Connie Eaton (March 1, 1950 – September 30, 1999) was a country music singer.  Eaton was a native of Nashville, Tennessee and began her recording career as a teenager in the late 1960s, recording for Chart Records.  Chart was the label that established Lynn Anderson as a major country singer and Eaton was considered by the country music press as the label's "next" Anderson.  Prior to beginning her recording career, Eaton had been a runnerup in a "Miss Nashville" beauty contest.  Her first record, "Too Many Dollars, Not Enough Sense", a Liz Anderson song, was released in 1968.

Eaton had a top 40 country hit with a cover of Merrilee Rush's pop record Angel of the Morning in 1970 which earned her a Billboard "Most Promising Female Vocalist" nomination but this proved to be Eaton's only hit record during her years on the Chart label although a duet with Dave Peel, a cover of Ray Charles' "Hit the Road Jack" came within a few spots of cracking the Top 40 also in 1970.  Eaton released three albums and numerous singles for Chart Records and later recorded for on a few minor labels.  In 1975, she returned to the major labels with an ABC Records contract and had her biggest hit, "Lonely  Men, Lonely Women", which peaked at No. 23.  Her album for ABC, however, did not chart and the follow-up singles were not successful.  By the late 1970s, Eaton was out of the music industry.  She died from cancer in 1999 at age 49.

Connie Eaton's daughter Cortney Tidwell is a recording artist in her own right.

Discography

Albums

Singles

External links
 Connie Eaton at Chart Records

1950 births
1999 deaths
American women country singers
American country singer-songwriters
Singers from Nashville, Tennessee
20th-century American singers
20th-century American women singers
Country musicians from Tennessee
Singer-songwriters from Tennessee